Richard de Wideslade was the Archdeacon of Barnstaple from 1318 to 1329.

References

Archdeacons of Barnstaple